Camp Buehring (formerly Camp Udairi) is a staging post for US troops in the northwestern region of Kuwait. From its founding in January 2003 to the present date, the base was used for military troops heading north into Iraq and is the primary location for the Middle Eastern Theater Reserve.  The areas surrounding Camp Buehring, known as the Udairi Range Complex, is largely uninhabited, except for a few nomadic Bedouin tribes raising camels, goats, and sheep. Camp New York is nearby, in the same Udairi Range Complex.

Camp Buehring is named after Lieutenant Colonel Charles H. Buehring who was killed in Baghdad on October 26, 2003. Buehring was among the highest-ranking U.S. casualties of the Iraq War. Camp Udairi was renamed in his honor in 2004.

History 
Much of Camp Buehring had operated continuously since its establishment in 2003.

A vehicle-ramming attack on March 30, 2003, left sixteen people wounded after a disgruntled Egyptian electrician rammed a pick-up truck into a group of US soldiers. The perpetrator was shot twice and wounded seriously.

During the spring of 2020, the worldwide coronavirus pandemic shuttered many of the morale, welfare, and recreation outlets on the post, as well as leading to the establishment of social distancing and mask usage guidelines. Quarantine procedures were mandatory for incoming personnel. The post had not experienced its own outbreak of the virus, though imported cases were recurring and infrequent.

Units
Aviation Brigades
 34th Expeditionary Combat Aviation Brigade 2008.
 Unknown CAB until April 2015
 185th Aviation Brigade (Theater) from April to December 2015
 1st Battalion, 137th Aviation Regiment during October 2015.
 40th Combat Aviation Brigade from December 2015 to August 2016
 1st Battalion (General Support), 168th Aviation Regiment 'Hercules' with Boeing CH-47F Chinook's
 Company B (Chinook)
 77th Combat Aviation Brigade from August 2016 to April 2017
 1st Battalion (General Support), 111th Aviation Regiment, 77th Combat Aviation Brigade during October 2016
 Company A (UH-60 & AH-64)
 29th Combat Aviation Brigade from April to December 2017
 449th Combat Aviation Brigade from December 2017. until August 2018
 1st Battalion (Assault), 244th Aviation Regiment (TF Voodoo) until August 2018.
 248th Aviation Support Battalion (TF Viper)
 35th Combat Aviation Brigade between August 2018 and  April 2019.
 1st Battalion (Assault Helicopter), 108th Aviation Regiment (TF Falon) until April 2019.
 935th Aviation Support Battalion
 38th Combat Aviation Brigade from April 2019
 8th Battalion, 229th Aviation Regiment from April 2019.
 34th Combat Aviation Brigade from 2019 to September 2020
 28th Expeditionary Combat Aviation Brigade (TF Anvil) from September 2020 until May 2021
 40th Combat Aviation Brigade (TF Phoenix) from May 2021 until January 2022
 1-168th General Support Aviation Battalion (TF Raptor)
 640th Aviation Support Battalion
 1-82nd Attack Reconnaissance Battalion (TF Wolfpack) (- October 2021)
 1-227th Attack Reconnaissance Battalion (TF Attack) (October 2021 - )
 Task Force Toro from the Spanish Armed Forces
 Task Force Griffon from the Italian Army
 11th Combat Aviation Brigade (TF Eagle) from January 2022 until August 2022.
 36th Combat Aviation Brigade (TF Mustang) between August 2022 and Present.
 449th Aviation Support Battalion (ASB)
 2-149th General Support Aviation Battalion (GSAB) (TF Rough Riders)
 3-142nd Assault Helicopter Battalion (AHB), New York Army National Guard
 1-101st Attack Aviation Battalion (Task Force No Mercy) of the 101st Airborne Division
 Task Force Toro from the Spanish Armed Forces
 Task Force Griffon from 5th Army Aviation Regiment "Rigel", Italian Army

Aviation Battalions
 2515th Naval Air Ambulance Detachment from HSC-21 and HSC-23 during 2007.
 1st Battalion (Attack Reconnaissance), 1st Aviation Regiment
 2nd Battalion (General Support), 1st Aviation Regiment

Ground forces
 4th BCT February–March 2004

References

External links

 Camp Buerhing at Global Security
 Army Lt. Col. Charles H. Buehring
 Stars and Stripes article on renaming to Camp Buehring

Military installations of the United States in Kuwait
Foreign relations of Kuwait
Buehring